Ny Tid is a Swedish language news magazine published in Gothenburg since 24 March 1892. It was initially marketed as "Journal for the class-conscious workers' movement in West-Sweden" and has from time to time appeared as a weekly or daily paper.

Socialist magazines
Magazines established in 1892
Swedish-language magazines
Mass media in Gothenburg